The Pont des Marchands is a historic bridge in Narbonne, southern France. It serves as a foundation for a row of houses and shops underneath which the Canal de la Robine runs through the old town. Its segmental arch has a span of ca. 15 m. In Roman times the structure featured as many as six arches.

It is one of only a handful of bridges worldwide that are lined with shops.



See also 
 Roman bridge
 List of Roman bridges
 List of medieval bridges in France
 Alte Nahebrücke
 High Bridge, Lincoln

References

Sources

External links 
 
 

Roman bridges in France
Roman segmental arch bridges
Deck arch bridges
Stone bridges in France
Bridges with buildings
Pont Marchands
Narbonne
Transport in Occitania (administrative region)
History of Narbonne